
Year 178 BC was a year of the pre-Julian Roman calendar. At the time it was known as the Year of the Consulship of Brutus and Vulso (or, less frequently, year 576 Ab urbe condita). The denomination 178 BC for this year has been used since the early medieval period, when the Anno Domini calendar era became the prevalent method in Europe for naming years.

Events 
 By place 
 Roman Republic 
 In Rome, the praetor Lucius Postumius Albinus celebrates a triumph after conquering the Vaccaei and Lusitani during his time as Roman commander in the province of Hispania Ulterior.

 Greece 
 One of Perseus' first acts on becoming king of Macedonia is to renew the treaty between Macedonia and Rome. In the meantime, Perseus builds up the Macedonian army and puts out feelers for creating an alliance with the Greek leagues, with his northern barbarian neighbours, and also with the Seleucid king Seleucus IV.

Deaths 
 Chen Ping, Chinese official and chancellor of the Western Han Dynasty
 Fu Sheng (Master Fu), Chinese Confucian scholar and writer (b. 268 BC)
 Liu Jiao, Chinese prince and younger brother of Emperor Gaozu of Han

References